Until 1 January 2007, Ebeltoft municipality was a municipality (Danish, kommune) in Aarhus County on the east coast of the Jutland peninsula in central Denmark.  The region lies in a geographic region known as southern Djursland, and more specifically Mols.  The municipality covered an area of 276 km2, and had a total population of 14.997 (2003).  Its last mayor was Jørgen Brøgger. The main town and the site of its municipal council was the town of Ebeltoft.

Ebeltoft municipality ceased to exist as the result of Kommunalreformen ("The Municipality Reform" of 2007).  It was merged with existing Midtdjurs, Rosenholm, and Rønde municipalities to form the new Syddjurs municipality. This created a municipality with an area of 693 km2 and a total population of 40,196 (2005). The new municipality belongs to Region Midtjylland ("Mid-Jutland Region").

Facts about the former municipality
The municipality itself consisted of two smaller peninsulas that jut out into the surrounding waters, one to the south, and the other to the west.  The southward peninsula, which contains the town of Ebeltoft, is surrounded on the east by Hjelm Deep, which separates the area from the small island of Hjelm off its eastern coast.  To the west of this peninsula is Ebeltoft Cove (Ebeltoft Vig) which forms a bay between the southward peninsula and the headland formed to the south of the westward peninsula, Helge Headland (Helgenæs).  To the west of Helge Headland is Aarhus Bay (Aarhus Bugt).  To the northwest of the westward peninsula is Knebel Cove (Knebel Vig) and Kalø Cove (Kalø Vig).

The municipality also was home to Lake Stubbe (Stubbe Sø) and several high elevations.  The high hilly moraine landscape is called Mols Bjerge (*Mols Hills*), and is a protected as Mols Bjerge National Park.  Some of the highest elevations in the area are Agri Bavnehøj at 137 meters, Trehøje at 127 meters, and Stabelhøjene at 135 and 133 meters in height.  The area has many burial mounds, stone monuments and graves, including Porskær Stenhus, Denmark's largest stone burial chamber near the town of Knebel.  Porskær Stenhus is over 2,000 years old.

The area known as Mols
Mols is an area in the southern part of Djursland on Jutland's east coast with Ebeltoft as its main city.  The residents of this area are known as Molboere ("Mols residents").  There have been written many fictional accounts of the stupidity of these people, referred to as Molbohistorier ("Stories of the Mols residents").

The town of Ebeltoft

Ebeltoft was granted its municipal charter in 1301.  The town is very picturesque, and has many well-preserved half-timbered houses and cobbled streets.

Among the town's highlights are the Frigate Jylland (Fregatten Jylland), the Ebeltoft Zoo, the Ebeltoft Museum, and the Glasmuseet Ebeltoft (Ebeltoft Glass Museum).
The Frigate Jylland was launched in 1860, and served as both royal yacht and battleship before it was reduced to a barracks ship in 1892. The ship has had a 10-year restoration.
The Glass Museum houses a large collection of contemporary glass from all over the world.

Other attractions
 Sletterhage Lighthouse at the southernmost point on Helgenæs
 Kalø Castle ruins (Kalø Slotsruin)

External links
 Syddjurs municipality's official website 
 South Djurs tourism bureau
 The Frigate Jylland
 The Ebeltoft Glass Museum

References 
 Municipal statistics: NetBorger Kommunefakta, delivered from KMD aka Kommunedata (Municipal Data)
 Municipal mergers and neighbors: Eniro new municipalities map

Former municipalities of Denmark
Aarhus County